Zabergan Peak is the rocky peak rising to 1039 m on Foyn Coast, Antarctic Peninsula, and surmounting Beaglehole Glacier to the northeast and Friederichsen Glacier to the southwest.

The feature is named after the Bulgar ruler Zabergan (6th century).

Location
British mapping in 1976.

Maps
 British Antarctic Territory.  Scale 1:200000 topographic map. DOS 610 Series, Sheet W 66 64.  Directorate of Overseas Surveys, Tolworth, UK, 1976.
 Antarctic Digital Database (ADD). Scale 1:250000 topographic map of Antarctica. Scientific Committee on Antarctic Research (SCAR). Since 1993, regularly upgraded and updated.

Notes

References
 Zabergan Peak. SCAR Composite Antarctic Gazetteer.
 Bulgarian Antarctic Gazetteer. Antarctic Place-names Commission. (details in Bulgarian, basic data in English)

External links
 Zabergan Peak. Copernix satellite image

Mountains of Graham Land
Foyn Coast
Bulgaria and the Antarctic